A stylus is a writing utensil, or a small tool for some other form of marking or shaping.

Stylus may also refer to:

Arts, entertainment, and media

Groups
Stylus (band),  Australian soul-pop group
Stylus, an alias of Point4, a quartet formed in 2001, comprising Pete Day, Phil Dyson, Paul (Bronze) Newton, and Daniel Sherman

Periodicals
Stylus Magazine, online music and film magazine launched in 2002
The Stylus, would-be periodical owned and edited by Edgar Allan Poe
The Stylus (Brockport), the student weekly newspaper of The College at Brockport, New York
The Stylus of Boston College, Massachustts

Computing and technology
Stylus (browser extension), user style manager
Stylus (computing), small pen-shaped instrument used to input commands to a computer screen, mobile device or graphics tablet
Stylus (stylesheet language), computer programming language
Stylus, the very small diamond or sapphire tip of a phonograph or record player cartridge (the "needle") used to "read" gramophone records
Stylus, Inc., a publisher of Amiga productivity software

Brands and enterprises
Avama Stylus, a Slovakian ultralight aircraft
Isuzu Stylus, a compact car built by Isuzu
Stylus Music, an independent British record label from the 1980s
Stylus Records, a label of Stereophonics

See also
Stylet (anatomy), an arthropod piercing mouthpart